The Yehud coinage is a series of small silver coins bearing the Aramaic inscription Yehud. They derive their name from the inscription YHD (𐤉‬𐤄𐤃‬), "Yehud", the Aramaic name of the Achaemenid Persian province of Yehud; others are inscribed YHDH, the same name in Hebrew.

Date and origin
The YHD coins are believed to date from the Persian period. On the other hand, it is possible that the YHDH coins are from the following Ptolemaic period.

Mildenburg dates Yehud coins from the early 4th century BCE to the reign of Ptolemy I (312–285 BCE), while Meshorer believes there was a gap during Ptolemy I's time and that minting resumed during Ptolemy II and continued into Ptolemy III, although this has been questioned. The earlier coins were almost certainly produced in imitation of Athenian coins and were used locally as a small change to supplement the larger denominations from more centralized mints elsewhere in the region.

A lot of these coins were probably minted in Jerusalem.

The use of figural art
Unlike later Jewish coinage, Yehud coins depict living creatures, flowers and even human beings.

During the First Temple period, figural art was frequently used, centralized cherubim over the Ark of the Covenant, the twelve oxen that supported the giant laver in front of Solomon's Temple, etc. Thus, it is likely that the Yehud coins are continuing the use of figural art from the previous period. The traditional religious prohibition against graven images was probably seen as relating only to idolatrous images rather than the purely decorative.

Depictions on the coinage include imagery borrowed from other cultures, such as the Athenian Owl, and various mythological creatures.
The lily flower was also commonly portrayed.

Various human images are also portrayed. Some coins bear images of Persian rulers. The identity of other human images are not always clear; some of them may even be images of Jewish leaders, such as Temple priests.

One coin depicts an enthroned deity, claimed by some experts to be Yahweh, while this is disputed by others. It has been suggested recently that this coin was actually minted in Samaria and depicts Samarian Yahweh.

Coin features and chronology

The coins from the Persian period tend to be inscribed in Aramaic "square script" or Paleo-Hebrew and use the Aramaic spelling of the province as 'y-h-d', while those coins from the Ptolemaic/Hellenistic period (or maybe earlier) are inscribed in the Paleo-Hebrew script and usually spell Judea as 'y-h-d', 'y-h-d-h' or 'y-h-w-d-h'.

Recent study by Yehoshua Zlotnik attempts to relate different kinds of coins, and the specifics of their manufacture to the changing political situation in Judea in the 4th century BCE. He deals with different coin-types, and with such unusual phenomena as minting on only one side of the coin, and seemingly deliberate flaws on certain dies. According to Zlotnik, these and other features can clarify the political state of affairs in Judah, such as independence, autonomy, or transition period. Zlotnik also does a comparison of Yehud coins with contemporary coins from various neighbouring mints, such as Samaria, Edom and Sidon.

According to Zlotnik, the first minting of “Yehud” coins began around 400 BCE under the influence of the contemporary Egyptian revolts against Persia. These were small silver coins (obols) imitating the Athenian model—the coins that were also quite common in Egypt at that time. Such coins were also the most commonly used coins in circulation in Philistia, Judea and Edom at this time.

When the Persian reconquered the area after 360 BCE, they gave permission for further minting of similar silver coins under their own governors. This type of minting continued also under the Ptolemies.

Mildenberg divides most of the Persian period 'Yehud' coinage into three groups: an early group of poorly defined coins with the head of Athena on the obverse with her owl on the reverse with the inscription 'y-h-d' in Paleo-Hebrew; the second group are more clearly defined and depict a lily, and an Egyptian falcon (see pictures), and the head of the Persian king, with the inscription 'y-h-d'; the third group has the Hebrew inscription 'Hezekiah the governor' (yhzqyh hphh). All these coins have been found in the area of Judea.

The Yehud coins come in two denominations, approximately .58 gram as a ma'ah and approximately .29 gram as a half ma'ah (chatzi ma'ah). These coins might have been minted in the first 40 years of the Second Temple era. For larger coinage, they first used Persian coinage, the Persian daric and the Sigloi; then Greek (Alexandrian Empire) coins like the drachma and the tetradrachm.

See also

Iudaea Province, the Roman province of Judaea (6–135 CE)
Yehud Medinata ("Province of Judah"), Persian province (6th-4th c. BCE)
List of historical currencies
ma'ah, Aramaic for gerah, ancient Hebrew unit of weight and currency
Hasmonean coinage
Shekel, ancient Near Eastern unit of weight and coin
Zuz, ancient Jewish name for certain silver coinage

References

Further reading
 Nahman Avigad, Bullae and Seals from a Post-Exilic Judean Archive. Publication: "Qedem" – Monographs of the Institute of Archaeology, The Hebrew University of Jerusalem. Editor: Y. Yadin, 1976.

External links

Judaea Coin Archive – Yehud
Yehud coins on the Menorah coin Project
Yehud coins on the Jewish Virtual Library
Yehud coins on the Israel Antiquities Authority website

4th-century BC works
3rd-century BC works
Numismatics
Historical currencies, List of
Jewish Ptolemaic history
Ancient Jewish Persian history
Ancient currencies
Aramaic inscriptions
Currencies of Israel
Achaemenid Empire